Saraca thaipingensis is a tree species native to southeast Asia in the family Fabaceae. It has yellow flowers, borne on old wood, and is grown as an ornamental for floral effect. Common names include yellow ashoka and yellow saraca.

Taxonomy
Saraca thaipingensis was first described by Nathaniel Cantley in 1897.

References

thaipingensis
Flora of tropical Asia
Plants described in 1897